McClammy is a surname. Notable people with the surname include:

Charles W. McClammy (1839–1896), American politician
Thad McClammy (born 1942), American politician